The 2025 United Nations Security Council election will be held in mid-2025 during the 79th session of the United Nations General Assembly, held at United Nations Headquarters in New York City. The elections are for five non-permanent seats on the UN Security Council for two-year mandates commencing on 1 January 2026.
In accordance with the Security Council's rotation rules, whereby the ten non-permanent UNSC seats rotate among the various regional blocs into which UN member states traditionally divide themselves for voting and representation purposes, the five available seats are allocated as follows:

Two for Africa 
One for the Asia-Pacific Group 
One for Latin America and the Caribbean
One for the Eastern European Group

The five members will serve on the Security Council for the 2026–27 period.

Candidates

Africa Group 
Candidates for 2 available positions are:

Eastern European Group 
Candidates for 1 available position are:

Asia-Pacific Group 
Candidates for 1 available position are:

See also
List of members of the United Nations Security Council

References

2025 elections
2025
Non-partisan elections